"Picture of You" is a song by Irish boy band Boyzone, released as the first single from their third studio album, Where We Belong (1998). Written by frontman Ronan Keating, Eliot Kennedy, and producers Absolute, the song peaked at No. 2 in both Ireland and the United Kingdom. It is best remembered as the ending theme song for the film Bean: The Ultimate Disaster Movie, for which Rowan Atkinson appeared as his character with the band on both the single cover and in the music video. Its appearance in the film allowed the song to win the Ivor Novello Award for Best Original Song for a Film or Broadcast at the 1998 ceremony.

Critical reception
Larry Flick from Billboard wrote, "This videogenic boy group continues in its quest to win the hearts of stateside teens with a cute confection that borrows heavily from the vintage Motown sound of the Temptations and the Four Tops. Unfortunately, their vocals are not nearly as soulful, even though their harmonies are note-perfect. Still, there should certainly be more than a handful of kiddie-driven top 40 stations that will find this track useful. Also, Polydor would be wise to court the mature ears of AC radio listeners, who will get a nostalgic charge out of this 'Picture'." A reviewer from Music Week rated it four out of five, describing it as a "catchy pop/soul song".

Track listings

 UK and European CD1
 "Picture of You" – 3:28
 "Let the Message Run Free" – 5:08
 "Words" (Spanglish version) – 4:02

 UK and European CD2
 "Picture of You" – 3:28
 "Picture of You" (extended mix) – 5:54
 "I've Got You" – 3:45

 UK cassette single
 "Picture of You" – 3:28
 "Picture of You" (extended mix) – 5:54

 Japanese CD single
 "Picture of You"
 "Let the Message Run Free"
 "Shooting Star"
 "Baby Can I Hold You" (7-inch edit)

Charts

Weekly charts

Year-end charts

Certifications

Cover versions
 In 1999, the song was covered in Portuguese by girlband Tentações on their second and final studio album Nunca Me Percas, titled as '"Tu és a Minha Loucura"
 In 2007, the song was performed by Westlife on their The Love Tour
 In 2007, the song was performed by Boyzone at their return performance on the Children in Need 2007 charity event
 In 2017, the song was performed by Elmo Magalona and Janella Salvador on the 31st PMPC Star Awards for Television

References

1997 singles
1997 songs
Boyzone songs
Mr. Bean
Number-one singles in Scotland
Polydor Records singles
Song recordings produced by Absolute (production team)
Songs written by Andy Watkins
Songs written by Eliot Kennedy
Songs written by Paul Wilson (songwriter)
Songs written by Ronan Keating
Songs written for films